Apostolius may refer to:
 Michael Apostolius (c. 1420–1480), Greek theologian and rhetorician of the 15th century
 Arsenius Apostolius (c. 1460–1538), one of Michael Apostolius's sons, a bishop and scholar